Fitzherbert Park is a cricket ground in Palmerston North in New Zealand, a home ground of the Central Districts. In February 2000, New Zealand Women defeated England Women at the ground.

The ground is situated on Fitzherbert Avenue in the parklands beside the Manawatū River. Known originally just as the Sportsground, it was renamed Fitzherbert Park in 1973.

Re-development
With the development of NZC Warrant of Fitness (WOF) and increasing expectations of the modern game Fitzherbert Park lost their NZC WOF due to the lack of effective irrigation to the outfield in droughty summers causing a brown bumpy outfield that first class players did not like.

Fitzherbert Park is unusual as it has three cricket blocks (two club and one representative) and a practice block within the one facility. During winter rugby league is played over the outfield and blocks making for more difficult management of the ground for the groundstaff.

Since losing the NZC WOF Palmerston North City Council in consultation with Manawatu Cricket Association had

 Extended the drainage across the whole ground
 Installed a full outfield pop up irrigation system
 Resurfaced the two Patumahoe blocks
 Replaced the Marton soil with Patumahoe on the town end block.

References

External links
Cricinfo
 CricketArchive

Cricket grounds in New Zealand
Sports venues in Palmerston North